Relative luminance   follows the photometric definition of luminance  including spectral weighting for human vision, but while luminance  is a measure of light in units such as , Relative luminance  values are normalized as 0.0 to 1.0 (or 1 to 100), with 1.0 (or 100) being a theoretical perfect reflector of 100% reference white. Like the photometric definition, it is related to the luminous flux density in a particular direction, which is radiant flux density weighted by the luminous efficiency function (λ) of the CIE Standard Observer.

The use of relative values is useful in color or appearance models that describe perception relative to the eye's adaptation state and a reference white. For example, in prepress for print media, the absolute luminance of light reflecting off the print depends on the specific illumination, but a color appearance model using relative luminance can predict the appearance by referencing the given light source.

Relative luminance and colorimetric spaces 
For CIE colorspaces XYZ and xyY, the letter  refers to relative luminance.

 or

Relative luminance and "gamma encoded" colorspaces 
 (and ) are both linear to changes in the volume of light. Conversions from color spaces where light or lightness are encoded with a power curve, such as most image and video formats, must be linearized before being transformed to Y or the XYZ space.

The simple method is to apply the inverse power curve to each of the color channels, as an example for several common RGB color spaces, a 2.2 power curve is applied:
 
 can then be calculated for these colorspaces by using the coefficients for the Y component of the transform matrix. For instance, for ITU-R BT.709 and sRGB both of which use the same primaries and whitepoint, relative luminance can be calculated from  RGB components: first convert the gamma-compressed RGB values to linear RGB, and then 
 

The formula reflects the luminous efficiency function as "green" light is the major component of luminance, responsible for the majority of light perceived by humans, and "blue" light the smallest component.

Different linear coefficients are needed to determine luminance for a given colorspace, which are calculated from their primary chromaticities (defined by their x&y or uʹ&vʹ chromaticity coordinates).  For RGB spaces that use real colors for primaries, these coefficients will be positive for the conversion into XYZ space, but may be negative for transforming back to RGB. The green coefficient is normally the largest and blue normally smallest, and normally form the middle row of the RGB-to-XYZ color transformation matrix.

For nonlinear gamma-compressed R′G′B′ color spaces as typically used for computer images, a linearization of the R′G′B′ components to RGB is needed before the linear combination.

Relative luminance should not be confused with luma  (Y prime), which is a weighted sum of nonlinear (gamma encoded) R′G′B′ components, where in some implementations the weighting coefficients are applied to the gamma encoded signal. Some colorspaces that use luma include Y′UV, Y′IQ, and Y′CbCr. To determine relative luminance, The  must be used with the subcomponents to create the gamma encoded R′G′B′ components, which are then linearized to RGB by inverting the gamma correction. These linearized RGB channels can then have the appropriate linear coefficients applied (based on the primary chromaticities) and summed to relative luminance .

Relative luminance and perceptual spaces 
 is linear to light, but human perception has a non-linear response to lightness/darkness/brightness. 

For L*a*b* and L*u*v* space, the  component is perceptual lightness (also known as "Lstar" and not to be confused with  luminance).  is intended to be linear to human perception of lightness/darkness, and since human perception of light is non-linear,  is a nonlinear function of relative luminance .

See also
 Luminance
 CIE 1931 color space
 Chromaticity

References

Color
Photometry
Film and video technology